Sarina  is a rural town and coastal locality in the Mackay Region, Queensland, Australia.

Geography 
The Bruce Highway passes through the locality from south to north, as does the North Coast railway line.

The town of Sarina is located on Plane Creek, which flows into the Coral Sea, but most of the urban development is on the northern side of the creek. The Bruce Highway and the railway line pass through the town, which is served by the Sarina railway station.

The neighbourhood of Oonooie lies 6.8 km south of the town and is the name of a former railway station on the North Coast line, which was named on 29 April 1915, reportedly after a principal clanswoman of that area.

The Goonyella railway line passes along the eastern boundary of the locality towards the Hay Point coal terminal.

Mount Chelona ( above sea level) is located in the north of the locality near where the Bruce Highway exits the locality north to Alligator Creek.

History 
Yuwibara  (also known as Yuibera, Yuri, Juipera, Yuwiburra) is an Australian Aboriginal language spoken on Yuwibara country. It is closely related to the Biri languages/dialects. The Yuwibara language region includes the landscape within the local government boundaries of the Mackay Region.

Sarina was originally known as Plane Creek, but took its present name from the Sarina Inlet which was in turn named after Sarina, the Greek mythological enchantress, by William Charles Borlase Wilson, a surveyor, some time before 1882.

Plane Creek Provisional School opened on 5 August 1897. In 1907 it became Plane Creek State School. In 1912 it was renamed Sarina State School. On 31 January 1956 a secondary department was added to the school, which operated until January 1964, when Sarina State High School opened.

Plane Creek Upper Provisional School opened on 1900 and closed on 1969. On 1 January 1909 it became Plane Creek Upper State School. In 1928 it was renamed Plane Creek West State School. It closed in 1969.

On Sunday 29 March 1908, the foundation block was laid for an Anglican church, adjacent to the court house. On Sunday 18 October 1908, the church was officially opened by Reverend T. Hely-Wilson. The church was dedicated to St Luke the Evangelist.

Hillside State School opened in 1909 and closed on circa 1926.

Middle Creek Provisional School opened in 1915. In 1916 it was renamed Laburnum Grove Provisional School. It closed circa 1941.

St Anne's Catholic Primary School was officially opened on 23 May 1925 by the Sisters of Mercy.

Mount Chelona State School opened on 4 September 1933 and closed circa 1941.

Swayneville State School opened on 26 August 1935.

Sarina State High School opened on 28 January 1964. In 2014, the school celebrated its 50th anniversary.

In the 2011 census, Sarina had a population of 5,730 people.

On 24 October 2014 the former Mount Pelion State School building was moved to Sarina from the Northview State School in Mount Pleasant (where it was relocated in 1987) to be restored as part of the Sarina Art and Craft Centre in Railway Square.

Heritage listings
Sarina has a number of heritage-listed sites, including:
 Broad Street: Sarina Air Raid Shelter
Broad Street: Sarina War Memorial

Economy 
Industries include sugar cane growing and milling, cattle grazing and agriculture. It is a major supplier of ethanol through Wilmar International's Plane Creek sugar mill.

Education 
Sarina State School is a government primary (Prep-6) school for boys and girls at Broad Street. In 2017, the school had an enrolment of 465 students with 35 teachers (33 full-time equivalent) and 24 non-teaching staff (17 full-time equivalent). It includes a special education program.

Swayneville State School is a government primary (Prep-6) school for boys and girls at 952 Sarina Marlborough Road. In 2017, the school had an enrolment of 112 students with 12 teachers (10 full-time equivalent) and 11 non-teaching staff (6 full-time equivalent). It includes a special education program.

St Anne's Catholic Primary School is a Catholic primary (Prep-6) school for boys and girls at 3 Range Road. In 2017, the school had an enrolment of 210 students with 20 teachers (17 full-time equivalent) and 15 non-teaching staff (7 full-time equivalent).

Sarina State High School is a government secondary (7-12) school for boys and girls at Anzac Street. In 2017, the school had an enrolment of 743 students with 64 teachers (61 full-time equivalent) and 43 non-teaching staff (27 full-time equivalent). It includes a special education program.

Amenities 
The Mackay Regional Council operates a library at 65 Broad Street and operates a mobile library service on a fortnightly schedule at Swayneville near the school. The library facility opened in 1984 with a major refurbishment in 2013.

The Sarina branch of the Queensland Country Women's Association meets at the QCWA Hall at 2 Broad Street.

There are a number of churches in Sarina, including:

 St Michael's Catholic Church at 1 Range Road
St Luke's Anglican Church at 58 Broad Street
Sarina Uniting Church at 7 Range Road
Wesleyan Methodist Church at 87 Range Road
Sarina Presbyterian Church at 23 Sarina Beach Road
New Life Church at 1 Leslie Street

Sport
Sarina is home of the Sarina Crocodiles, a Rugby league club, producing Queensland representative players including Martin Bella, Dale Shearer, Kevin Campion, Daly Cherry-Evans and dual international Wendell Sailor.

Attractions 

A large cane toad statue, called Buffy, is situated in the town centre on the Bruce Highway in honour of Sarina's cane farming history. Buffy was made from fibreglass in the early 1980s for a parade float for the Apex Sugar Festival. The name Buffy comes from the species name bufo marinus. Buffy has been painted for the "state of origin" football game multiple times and has even been stolen. To try and deter further theft, buffy has been chained to the concrete slab on broad street where he resides, though this hasn't stopped people from decorating Buffy with "Queenslander" flags and state of origin banners.

The Sarina Arts & Craft Centre is at 1 Railway Square adjacent to the Mackay Region Visitor Information Centre. It occupies three historic buildings: the old court house built in 1906, the old jail built circa 1906, and the former Mount Pelion State School building built 1926.

Sarina Museum is also in Railway Square in the former Catholic presbytery relocated to this site in 2001.

Also in Railway Square is the Sarina Sugar Shed, an information centre about the sugar industry. It shows how sugar is grown and processed using a working miniature sugar mill into an array of products.

Notable people from Sarina
 Martin Bella – former professional rugby league footballer, represented Australia and Queensland
 Kevin Campion – Former professional Rugby league represented Queensland
 Paul Campion – Radio host
 Daly Cherry-Evans – Professional Rugby league player, represented Queensland and Australia
 Wendell Sailor – Professional Rugby league and Rugby union player
 Dale Shearer – former professional rugby league footballer, represented Australia and Queensland

See also
 Sarina railway station
 List of tramways in Queensland

References

Further reading

External links

 
 

 
Mackay Region
Towns in Queensland
North Queensland
Coastline of Queensland
Localities in Queensland